Chu Kyo-sung is a male former international table tennis player from South Korea.

He attended  in Busan.

He won a bronze medal at the 1995 World Table Tennis Championships in the Swaythling Cup (men's team event) with Kim Bong-chul, Kim Taek-soo, Lee Chul-seung and Yoo Nam-kyu for South Korea.

Two years later he won another bronze medal at the 1997 World Table Tennis Championships in the Swaythling Cup (men's team event) with Kim Taek-soo, Lee Chul-seung, Oh Sang-eun and Yoo Nam-kyu.

See also
 List of table tennis players
 List of World Table Tennis Championships medalists

References

South Korean male table tennis players
Living people
Asian Games medalists in table tennis
Table tennis players at the 1994 Asian Games
Medalists at the 1994 Asian Games
Asian Games gold medalists for South Korea
Asian Games silver medalists for South Korea
World Table Tennis Championships medalists
Year of birth missing (living people)